The International Journal of Sensor Networks (IJSNet) is a monthly peer-reviewed scientific journal covering research on distributed, wired, and wireless sensor networks. It is published by Inderscience Publishers. The journal was established in 2006.

Abstracting and indexing 
The journal is abstracted and indexed in Science Citation Index Expanded, Current Contents/Engineering, Computing & Technology, Scopus, Academic OneFile, and the ACM Digital Library.

References

External links 
 

Engineering journals
English-language journals
Publications established in 2006
Quarterly journals
Inderscience Publishers academic journals